The  is an art museum in Kyoto, Japan.

This Kyoto museum is also known by the English acronym MoMAK (Museum of Modern Art, Kyoto).

History
The National Museum of Modern Art, Kyoto (MoMAK) was initially created as the Annex Museum of the National Museum of Modern Art in Tokyo.  MoMAK was established on its present site on March 1, 1963. Its building, formerly the auxiliary building of the Kyoto Municipal Exhibition Hall for Industrial Affairs, was transferred from Kyoto City to the National Museum after restoration.  On June 1, 1967, the Kyoto Annex Museum officially became the National Museum of Modern Art, Kyoto.  Seventeen years later, the old building was dismantled and the present building, designed by  Fumihiko Maki was completed.

The museum was opened to the public on October 26, 1986, with 9,761.99 m² total floor area and 2,604.94 m² exhibition area.

MoMAK collections

MoMAK is a national institution devoted to the collection and preservation of artworks and related reference materials of the twentieth century in Japan and other parts of the world.  Particular *emphasis is placed on artists or artistic movements in Kyoto and the Kansai area (the western region of Japan), such as Japanese-style paintings of the Kyoto School.

The gallery exhibits selected works of Japanese-style painting (nihonga), Western-style painting (yōga), prints, sculpture, crafts (ceramics, textiles, metalworks, wood and bamboo works, lacquers and jewelry) and photography from the museum collection, rotating the works on display approximately twenty times a year.  Outstanding and monumental works of modern art in Japan, as well as modern and contemporary European and American art are also exhibited.

Union catalog
The Union Catalog of the Collections of the National Art Museums, Japan, is a consolidated catalog of material held by the four Japanese national art museums—the National Museum of Modern Art, Kyoto (MoMAK), the National Museum of Modern Art, Tokyo (MOMAT), the National Museum of Art, Osaka (NMAO), and the National Museum of Western Art in Tokyo (NMWA):

 National Museum of Modern Art, Kyoto (MoMAK).
 National Museum of Modern Art, Tokyo (MOMAT)
 National Museum of Art, Osaka (NMAO)
 National Museum of Western Art (NMWA)

The online version of this union catalog is currently under construction, with only selected works available at this time.

Selected artists

 Yaacov Agam (1928-  ), Israel
 Pierre Alechinsky (1927-  ), Belgium
 Jean Arp (1886–1966), France
 Georges Braque (1882–1963), France
 André Breton (1896–1966), France
 Marc Chagall (1887–1985), France
 Dale Chihuly (1941-  ), US
 Max Ernst (1891–1976), Germany
 Tsuguharu Fujita (1886–1968), Japan
 David Gilhooly (1943-  ), US
 Barbara Hepworth (1903–1975), UK
 Kaii Higashiyama (1908–1999), Japan
 Shunso Hishida (1874–1911), Japan
 David Hockney (1937-  ), UK
 Wassily Kandinsky (1866–1944), Rumania
 Oda Kaisen (1785–1862), Japan
 Tomioka Tessai (1837–1924), Japan
 Ayako Tsuru (1941-   ),Mexico city
 Frank Lloyd Wright (1867–1959), US
 Sibyl Heijnen (1960 - ), Netherlands

Notes

See also
 List of Independent Administrative Institutions (Japan)

References
 Hufnagl, Florian. (2004).  Designmuseen der Welt eingeladen durch Die Neue Sammlung München: Eingeladen Durch Die Neue Sammlung München (Design Museums of the World : Invited by 'Die Neue Sammlung' Munich). Basel: Birkhäuser. ;  OCLC 53130762

External links

 Official web site
  Independent Administrative Institution National Museum of Art (in Japanese)

National museums of Japan
Museums in Kyoto
Art museums and galleries in Japan
Modern art museums in Japan
Art museums established in 1963
1963 establishments in Japan